Kurt Capewell (born 12 July 1993) is an Australian professional rugby league footballer who plays as a  forward and  for the Brisbane Broncos in the NRL. 

He previously played for the Cronulla-Sutherland Sharks and Penrith Panthers in the National Rugby League with whom he was an NRL premiership winning player of 2021. At state representative level he has played for Queensland in the State of Origin series.

Background
Capewell was born in Charleville, Queensland, Australia. He is the younger cousin of former South Sydney Rabbitohs, Gold Coast Titans and Brisbane Broncos player Luke Capewell.

Capewell played his junior rugby league for Charleville and the Norths Ipswich Tigers. After playing some rugby union and being chosen to train with the Ipswich Jets in the Queensland Cup, he was signed by the Brisbane Broncos.

Playing career

Early career
In 2012 and 2013, Capewell played for the Brisbane Broncos' NYC team. In 2013, he had a stint with the Sydney Roosters' NYC team, before returning to Queensland to play for the Ipswich Jets. On 27 September 2015, he played for the Jets in their 2015 Queensland Cup Grand Final win over the Townsville Blackhawks. He then went on to play for the Jets in their 2015 NRL State Championship win over New South Wales Cup premiers Newcastle Knights on 4 October that same year. On 29 October 2015, he signed a 1-year contract with the Cronulla-Sutherland Sharks starting in 2016.

2016
In Round 18 of the 2016 NRL season, Capewell made his NRL debut for Cronulla against the Penrith Panthers. In September 2016, he was named on the interchange bench in the 2016 Intrust Super Premiership NSW Team of the Year.

2017
Capewell made his first appearance of the 2017 NRL season in round 2 against the Canberra Raiders, playing at centre in Cronulla's 42–16 victory.

2018
Capewell made 19 appearances for Cronulla in the 2018 NRL season as the club finished 4th on the table.  Capewell played in Cronulla's preliminary final defeat against Melbourne at AAMI Park.

2019
Capewell made 25 appearances for Cronulla in the 2019 NRL season as the club finished 7th on the table and qualified for the finals.  Capewell played from the bench in Cronulla's elimination final defeat against Manly at Brookvale Oval.
On 26 November, Capewell signed a two-year deal to join Penrith starting in the 2020 NRL season.

2020
Capewell missed the first two games of the season with a quad injury before returning from injury and debuting for the Penrith Panthers after the Covid shutdown in round 3 against the Newcastle Knights scoring a try in a 14–14 draw. In round 5, Capewell injured his MCL in the first minute of the game against the Parramatta Eels, in a 16–10 loss missing 12 weeks. Capewell returned in the round 17 game against the Brisbane Broncos scoring a try in the 25–12 win. Capewell played off the interchange bench in the 2020 NRL Grand Final in Penrith's 26–20 loss against Melbourne. On 4 November, Capewell made his Origin debut for Queensland debuting in the centres.

2021
In round 3 of the 2021 NRL season against Melbourne in the grand final rematch, he scored the match winning try in a 12–10 victory. 
On 1 July, Capewell signed a three-year deal with Brisbane.
On October 3, Capewell played his last game for Penrith in their 14-12 Grand final victory over South Sydney.

2022
Capewell made his Brisbane debut in Round 1, acting as captain in the absence of Adam Reynolds. He kicked the match-winning field goal in the 11-4 upset over South Sydney at Suncorp Stadium.
Capewell made a total of 19 appearances for Brisbane in the 2022 season scoring five tries. Brisbane would finish the year in 9th place and miss the finals.

Personal life
In December 2020, Capewell revealed that several years earlier, he had been involved in a pornographic film with another man (Capewell believed the other person to be a woman) where he performed a sexual act. Capewell, who at the time was 20 years old and playing for the Ipswich Jets, was taking part in a photo-shoot for a sports clothing and underwear company before it turned to nude photos then an adult movie. Capewell reflected on the incident saying "The organiser used inducements and extra money for being involved in the adult film. I take full responsibility for what happened".

References

External links

Penrith Panthers profile
Cronulla Sharks profile
Cronulla-Sutherland Sharks profile

1993 births
Living people
Australian rugby league players
Cronulla-Sutherland Sharks players
Ipswich Jets players
Newtown Jets NSW Cup players
Penrith Panthers players
Brisbane Broncos players
Queensland Rugby League State of Origin players
Rugby league second-rows
Rugby league centres
Rugby league wingers
Rugby league players from Queensland